Napalm Death: Thrash to Death is a short heavy metal music documentary aired on British channel BBC. Thrash to Death centers around grindcore pioneers Napalm Death. An interview with its four members is conducted at their hometown (Birmingham, UK), interspersed with footage from their live show at the ULU, also featured on Arena'''s "Heavy Metal" documentary.

The setlist of Napalm Death's ULU performance is focused on songs of their Scum (1987) and From Enslavement to Obliteration (1988) albums. Half of the songs have a slightly shorter length than their original studio counterparts. Also, they pay an impromptu homage to one of their early influences, Flint, Michigan band Repulsion, playing the first bars of "The Stench of Burning Death" as an intro to one of their songs, "Deceiver".

Background

Earache's Digby Pearson recalled:

Plot summary
Guitarist Bill Steer then explains the musical characteristics of death metal:

Track listing

Tracks #1, #3, the second half of #5 ("Deceiver") and #6 are taken from Napalm Death's debut, Scum. Tracks #2 and #4 are taken from the album From Enslavement to Obliteration. The first half of track #5 ("The Stench of Burning Death") is taken from Repulsion's 1986 demo tape, Horrified''.

British documentary films
Documentary films about heavy metal music and musicians
Heavy metal television series